The Patapsco and Back Rivers Railroad  was a Class III switching and terminal railroad, operating in Baltimore County. Owned for the majority of its existence by the Bethlehem Steel Corporation, the railroad primarily served Bethlehem Steel's Sparrows Point Terminal  area. MCM Management Corporation purchased the PBR, through their purchase of RG Steel corporation, and renamed the railroad the Baltimore Industrial Railroad  in 2012. RG Steel, LLC

History

The Patapsco & Back Rivers Railroad, was incorporated by the Bethlehem Steel Corporation in 1916 to perform switching operations around their expanding steel mill and shipbuilding operations at Sparrows Point. The railroad takes its name from the rivers surrounding the point.

The PBR interchanged with the Pennsylvania Railroad at a location known as Gray's Station. This yard continued to be its connection through the years with the Pennsylvania's successors Penn Central, Conrail, and finally CSX and NS. The B&O and Western Maryland Railway also ran car floats of raw materials from their ports in the Baltimore Harbor to Sparrows Point that would be off loaded by the PBR.

The PBR owned primarily steam and later diesel switching locomotives, from various manufacturers such as Baldwin, ALCO, and EMD for moving cars in and out of Sparrows Point. The PBR also rostered a fleet of gondolas for delivering finished products from the plant.

The decline of the US steel market in the latter half of the twentieth-century caused a decline in traffic for the PBR as Bethlehem Steel shut down many of its operations at Sparrows Point. Steel making on the point would cease forever when the fourth successor to Bethlehem Steel, RG Steel went bankrupt in 2012 and the site was liquidated. 

Much of the track from the PBR remains in place as the area, under development as Tradepoint Atlantic, awaits redevelopment and new tenants.

Preserved Equipment

References

External links

 Tradepoint Atlantic website for Sparrows Point site redevelopment
 Maryland Department of Transportation map of in state railroads.
 Patapsco & Back Rivers Railroad Photographic Roster

Companies based in Baltimore
Maryland railroads
Switching and terminal railroads
Transportation in Baltimore